Gambang–Kuantan Highway, Federal Route 2, which is also known as Jalan Gambang and Jalan Tanah Putih, is a major highway in Kuantan, Pahang, Malaysia. The highway connects Gambang to Kuantan.

This highway overlaps with Federal Route 3 from Kuantan Airport (South) Interchange to Jalan Pekan Exit.

List of interchanges

See also
Malaysia Federal Route 2

Highways in Malaysia